Mohamed Hashi Elmi is a Somali politician who served as the Minister of Finance of Somaliland from July 2010 to March 2012. He is the former mayor of Hargeisa from 1993 to 1996.

See also

 Mayor of Hargeisa
 Cabinet of Somaliland
 Ministry of Finance (Somaliland)

References

|-

Living people
Government ministers of Somaliland
Finance Ministers of Somaliland
Mayors of Hargeisa
Year of birth missing (living people)